Mohaisen Mubarak Al Jam'an Al Dosari (born 6 April 1966) is a former Saudi football (soccer) player. He represented the Saudi national team during the period 1984–1994. He played as a striker.

With the national team
Al-Jam'an competed in the 1984 Summer Olympics.

With Al-Nassr
In 2000 winning Asia's super cup entitled Al Nasr to play in the inaugural 2000 FIFA Club World Championship held in Brazil. Mohaisen played in all three matches, against Real Madrid of Spain (lost 1–3), Corinthians of Brazil (lost 0–2) and Raja of Morocco (won 4–3).

International goals

References

External links

Mohaisen Al-Jam'an's profile at FIFA

1966 births
Living people
Saudi Arabian footballers
Saudi Arabia international footballers
1984 AFC Asian Cup players
1988 AFC Asian Cup players
Footballers at the 1984 Summer Olympics
AFC Asian Cup-winning players
Olympic footballers of Saudi Arabia
Al Nassr FC players
Asian Games medalists in football
Footballers at the 1986 Asian Games
1997 FIFA Confederations Cup players
Saudi Professional League players
Asian Games silver medalists for Saudi Arabia
Association football forwards
Medalists at the 1986 Asian Games
people from Riyadh